Euphorbia neriifolia is a species of spurge, which was originally described by Carl Linnaeus in 1753.

Description

Gallery

References 

neriifolia
Taxa named by Carl Linnaeus
Plants described in 1753